The Gulf of Darién is the southernmost region of the Caribbean Sea, located north and east of the border between Panama and Colombia. Within the gulf is the Gulf of Urabá, a small lip of sea extending southward, between Caribana Point and Cape Tiburón, Colombia, on the southern shores of which is the port city of Turbo, Colombia. The Atrato River delta extends into the Gulf of Darién.

The Darien Scheme

The Gulf of Darién was the site of the Darien scheme, autonomous Scotland's one major attempt at colonialism. The first expedition of five ships (Saint Andrew, Caledonia, Unicorn, Dolphin, and Endeavour) set sail from Leith on July 14, 1698, with around 1,200 people on board. Their orders were "to proceed to the Bay of Darien, and make the Isle called the Golden Island ... some few leagues to the leeward of the mouth of the great River of Darien ... and there make a settlement on the mainland". After calling at Madeira and the West Indies, the fleet made landfall off the coast of Darien on November 2. The settlers christened their new home "New Caledonia".

See also
 Darién Gap
 Guna people

External links

References

Additional sources
 Alí, Maurizio. 2010: “En estado de sitio: los kuna en Urabá. Vida cotidiana de una comunidad indígena en una zona de conflicto”. Universidad de Los Andes, Facultad de Ciencias Sociales, Departamento de Antropología. Bogotá: Uniandes. .
 Gallup-Diaz, Ignacio. 1999 The Door of the Seas and Key to the Universe: Indian Politics and Imperial Rivalry in the Darién, 1640-1750. New York: Columbia University Press on the Gutenberg-e project: www.gutenberg-e.org. 
 Méndez, Horacio. (1996). La historia de mis abuelos: Textos del pueblo Tule, Panamá - Colombia. Colombia: Asociación de Cabildos Indígenas de Antioquia.
 Watt, Douglass (2006). The price of Scotland: Darien, union and the wealth of the nations. Edinburgh: Luath Press. 
 Storrs, Christopher (1999). "Disaster at Darien (1698–1700)? The Persistence of Spanish Imperial Power on the Eve of the Demise of the Spanish Habsburgs". European History Quarterly 29 (1): 5–38.

Darien
Darien
Darien
Colombian coasts of the Caribbean Sea
Panamanian coasts of the Caribbean Sea
Former Scottish colonies